Skillman may refer to:

People with the surname
Becky Skillman (born 1950), American politician
Evan D. Skillman (born 1955), American astronomer and astrophysicist
Hope Skillman Schary (c. 1908–1981), American textile designer
Judith Skillman (born 1954), American poet
Melanie Skillman (born 1954), American archer

Places
LBJ/Skillman (DART station), in Dallas, Texas
Skillman, New Jersey, an unincorporated community within Montgomery Township